The 1986 Florida Gators football team represented the University of Florida during the 1986 NCAA Division I-A football season. The season was Galen Hall's third as the head coach of the Florida Gators football team.  The 1986 Florida Gators compiled a 6–5 overall record and a Southeastern Conference (SEC) record of 2–4, tying for 7th place among Ten SEC teams. This was  the last year that Florida lost to the Kentucky Wildcats until 2018. This was the longest annual win streak of any team over another in NCAA history and the longest such streak in Southeastern Conference history.

Schedule

Personnel

Season summary

Georgia Southern

Miami (FL)

Alabama

at Mississippi State

LSU

Kerwin Bell was injured during the game.

Kent State

at Rutgers

at Giants Stadium

Auburn

Source: 
    
    
    
    
    
    

For most of the game, coach Pat Dye's fifth-ranked 1986 Auburn Tigers dominated coach Galen Hall's unranked Gators at Florida Field.  The Tigers defense was stifling, and forced Gators substitute quarterback Rodney Brewer to commit four turnovers in the first two quarters.  Hall replaced Brewer with starting quarterback Kerwin Bell, who had missed two games with a knee injury. Tigers tailback Brent Fullwood gained 166 yards on the ground, including a second-quarter touchdown, to give Auburn a 17–0 lead early in the fourth quarter.  Bell then led the Gators on two scoring drives, with Gators placekicker Robert McGinty—a transfer from Auburn—booting a 51-yard field goal to close the Tigers' advantage to 17−10 with 1:45 to play.  With thirty-six seconds remaining in the game, Bell directed one final 79-yard drive in ten plays that was capped by a five-yard touchdown pass to wide receiver Ricky Nattiel, who was playing with a separated shoulder. The limping Bell then surprised the Tigers defense by running in the two-point conversion and completing the comeback, with the Gators winning 18–17.

vs. Georgia

at Kentucky

at Florida State

References

Florida
Florida Gators football seasons
Florida Gators football